Guoju Subdistrict is a subdistrict in Beilun District, Ningbo, Zhejiang province, China. , it has two residential communities and 18 villages under its administration.
Donggang Community
Fengnan Community
Fumin Village
Datutang Village
Ximen Village
Dongmen Village
Beimen Village
Nanmen Village
Jianling'ao Village
Luting Village
Shuang'ao Village
Xiejia'ao Village
Huashi Village
Dalingxia Village
Sheng'ao Village
Lianhe Village
Yangzhang Village
Changpu Village
Shuangtun Village
Changkeng Village

See also 
 List of township-level divisions of Zhejiang

References 

Township-level divisions of Zhejiang
Geography of Ningbo